Tharaka Constituency is an electoral constituency in Kenya. It is one of three constituencies in Tharaka-Nithi County. The constituency was established prior to the 1988 elections.

Members of Parliament

Wards

See also 
 List of constituencies of Kenya

References 

Constituencies in Tharaka-Nithi County
Constituencies in Eastern Province (Kenya)
1988 establishments in Kenya
Constituencies established in 1988